Gosławice may refer to the following places in Poland:
Gosławice, Lower Silesian Voivodeship (south-west Poland)
Gosławice, Kuyavian-Pomeranian Voivodeship (north-central Poland)
Gosławice, Kutno County in Łódź Voivodeship (central Poland)
Gosławice, Łowicz County in Łódź Voivodeship (central Poland)
Gosławice, Radomsko County in Łódź Voivodeship (central Poland)
Gosławice, Lesser Poland Voivodeship (south Poland)
Gosławice, Opole Voivodeship (south-west Poland)
Gosławice, a district of the city of Opole.
Gosławice, a northern neighbourhood of Konin and eponymous train station.